"Monsieur Dupont" is the twenty-first single by British singer Sandie Shaw.

It reached number six in the UK Singles Chart in 1969, making it her eighth and final top 10 hit single.
It also reached number six in South Africa in March 1969.

Shaw performed the song on BBC's Top of the Pops on 30 January 1969, introduced by Stuart Henry.

References

External links
 Sandie Shaw on Hamburger Starclub (first part of page in German)

1967 songs
1969 singles
Sandie Shaw songs
Songs written by Peter Callander
Pye Records singles
Franglais songs